Bato: The General Ronald dela Rosa Story is a 2019 Filipino biographical action film directed by Adolfo Alix Jr., starring Robin Padilla as the titular police official.

Cast
Robin Padilla as Gen. Ronald "Bato" dela Rosa
Kiko Estrada as PMA cadet Bato
Ryle Paolo Santiago as teenage Bato
Miguel Vergara as child Bato
Beauty Gonzalez as Nancy dela Rosa
Alyssa Muhlach Alvarez as young Nancy
Joko Diaz as a terrorist
Polo Ravales as a terrorist
Ali Forbes
Chanel Morales
Monsour del Rosario as a police officer
Jake Joson as a negotiator
Ricky Davao as Doro dela Rosa
Gina Alajar as Anesia dela Rosa
Dennis Roldan as an NPA leader
Dindo Arroyo as an NPA leader
Val Iglesia as an NPA leader
Ping Medina as an NPA informer
Archie Alemania as a police officer
Efren Reyes Jr. as Mayor Rodrigo Duterte
Allan Paule as Governor

Development
In early December 2018, Ronald dela Rosa expressed his desire for Robin Padilla and Sharon Cuneta to respectively play him and his wife Nancy if ever a film is made about him. He also has expressed his preference to have the film focus on his biography rather than his romance with his wife in particular. Bato was directed by Adolfo Alix Jr.

Release
Bato premiered at the SM Megamall in Ortigas Center, Mandaluyong on January 30, 2019, with Philippine President Rodrigo Duterte in attendance.

Controversy
Bato has caused controversy for being released at the time dela Rosa was a candidate for the 2019 Philippine Senate election. The Commission on Elections has warned that dela Rosa could be disqualified if the film is still being aired in Philippine cinemas on February 12, 2019 or the official start of the campaign period for national candidates.

See also
"Steak", a television episode about Christopher "Bong" Go, a candidate for the 2019 senate election
"Tatlong Henerasyon ng Sipag at Tiyaga", a television episode about the family of Cynthia Villar, a candidate for the 2019 senate election

References

External links

2019 films
2019 action films
2010s biographical films
Cultural depictions of Filipino men
Cultural depictions of Rodrigo Duterte
Filipino-language films
Films about police officers
Films set in the 1980s
Philippine action films
Philippine biographical films
Regal Entertainment films
Biographical action films
Films directed by Adolfo Alix Jr.